Ondřej Veselý (born December 6, 1977) is a Czech professional ice hockey player who currently plays with HC Kometa Brno in the Czech Extraliga. Veselý previously played for Portland Winter Hawks, Tri City Americans, HC Zlín, HC Vsetín and HC České Budějovice.

References

External links

1977 births
Czech ice hockey forwards
Motor České Budějovice players
HC Kometa Brno players
VHK Vsetín players
PSG Berani Zlín players
Living people
Sportspeople from Zlín
HC Sibir Novosibirsk players
Tri-City Americans players
Portland Winterhawks players
Czech expatriate ice hockey players in Russia
Czech expatriate ice hockey players in the United States